Cultures of Vision is a 1995 book by Ron Burnett, in which the author explores the relationship between visual cultures and popular culture. It was published by the Indiana University Press.

References

External links
 An extensive web site to explore the book and its contents

1995 non-fiction books
English-language books
Indiana University Press books
Sociology books